This is a list of events in animation in 2011.


Events

January
 January 9: The first episode of Bob's Burgers airs.
 January 24: The first episode of Bubble Guppies airs on Nickelodeon

February
 February 14: Disney Junior launches as Disney Channel's new preschool block after Playhouse Disney was shut down.
 February 20: The Simpsons episode "Angry Dad: The Movie" premieres, guest starring Nick Park, creator of Wallace and Gromit.
 February 27: 83rd Academy Awards:
 Toy Story 3 by Lee Unkrich wins the Academy Award for Best Animated Feature. The song We Belong Together by Randy Newman from the same movie wins the Academy Award for Best Original Song.
 The Lost Thing by Andrew Ruhemann and Shaun Tan wins the Academy Award for Best Animated Short Film.

March
 March 13: 
 The first episode of BoBoiBoy airs.
 The Simpsons episode "A Midsummer's Nice Dream" premieres, guest starring Cheech and Chong.
 March 22: The film Rio is released.
 March 23: Sym-Bionic Titan is canceled after 20 episodes due to low merchandise sales and series creator Genndy Tartakovsky leaving Cartoon Network to work with Sony Pictures Animation.
 March 26: The first episode of Larva airs.

April
 April 1: Illumination's live-action/animated film, Hop is released.

May
 May 1: The first episode of Raa Raa the Noisy Lion airs.
 May 3: The first episodes of The Amazing World of Gumball, Punky, and The Looney Tunes Show air.
 May 22: 
 The film Kung Fu Panda 2 premiers.
 The Simpsons episode "The Ned-Liest Catch" airs, in which Ned Flanders and Edna Krabappel become romantically involved, ending on a cliffhanger regarding whether or not they'll stay together. Viewers are invited to vote over the matter. On September 25, at the start of the new season, the next episode "The Falcon and the D'ohman" reveals that they have indeed become a couple by viewer request.

June
 June 1: 
 Peter Dodd's Freddy Frogface premiers.
 Joann Sfar and Antoine Delesvaux' The Rabbi's Cat is released, based on Sfar's graphic novel of the same name.
 June 18: The Walt Disney Company/Pixar film Cars 2 is released.
 June 27: Nickelodeon launches a revival of Winx Club with a one-hour special.
 Specific date unknown: Dutch animator Rosto's The Monster of Nix is released, a mixture of live-action and animation, with the voices of Tom Waits, Terry Gilliam and The Residents.

July
 July 15: Winnie the Pooh is released; the last traditionally animated film produced by Walt Disney Animation Studios.
 July 17: Goro Miyazaki's From Up on Poppy Hill premiers.

August
 August 19: Alan Becker releases "Animator vs Animation III" on Newgrounds
 August 31: After 11 years, Between the Lions is removed from PBS Kids.

September
 September 12: The first episode of Detentionaire airs.
 September 16: The film Top Cat: The Movie premiers.
 September 21: The first episode of Plim Plim airs.
 September 29: The Danish film Ronal the Barbarian is released.

October
 October 2: 
 The first episode of China, IL airs.
 The Simpsons episode "Bart Stops to Smell the Roosevelts" premieres, with its couch gag being animated by John Kricfalusi.
 October 16: Puss in Boots, a spin-off in the Shrek franchise, is first released.
 October 18: The film Batman: Year One is first released.
 October 23: Steven Spielberg and Peter Jackson release The Adventures of Tintin: The Secret of the Unicorn, a CGI-film adaptation of the Belgian comics series Tintin.
 October 27: A reboot of Beavis and Butt-Head first airs, but only lasts a season. The series would later have another revival on Paramount+ in 2022.

November
 November 6: The Simpsons episode "Replaceable You" premieres, where the character Mrs. Glick dies.
 November 11: The film Arthur Christmas is released by Aardman Animations and Sony Pictures Animation.
 November 18: The film Happy Feet Two is first released.
 November 23: Jean-François Laguionie's The Painting premiers.

December
 December 28: Bambi and A Computer Animated Hand are added to the National Film Registry.

Specific date unknown
 Robert Morgan's Bobby Yeah premiers.

Awards
 Academy Award for Best Animated Feature: Rango
 Animation Kobe Feature Film Award: Macross Frontier: Sayonara no Tsubasa
 Annecy International Animated Film Festival Cristal du long métrage: The Rabbi's Cat
 Annie Award for Best Animated Feature: Rango
 Asia Pacific Screen Award for Best Animated Feature Film: Leafie, A Hen into the Wild
 BAFTA Award for Best Animated Film: Rango
 César Award for Best Animated Film: The Rabbi's Cat
 European Film Award for Best Animated Film: Chico and Rita
 Goya Award for Best Animated Film: Wrinkles
 Japan Academy Prize for Animation of the Year: From up on Poppy Hill
 Japan Media Arts Festival Animation Grand Prize: Puella Magi Madoka Magica
 Mainichi Film Awards - Animation Grand Award: Hotarubi no Mori e

Films released

 January 6 - 3 to the rescue (Dominican Republic)
 January 18:
 LeapFrog: Numbers Ahoy (United States)
 Leapfrog: The Amazing Alphabet Amusement Park (United States)
 January 21 - Pleasant Goat and Big Big Wolf – Moon Castle: The Space Adventure (China)
 January 22 - Broken Blade 5: Death's Horizon (Japan)
 January 25 - Dead Space: Aftermath (United States)
 February 3 - Little Big Panda (China, France, Germany, Luxembourg and Spain)
 February 10:
 Fimfarum – The Third Time Lucky (Czech Republic)
 The Great Bear (Denmark)
 February 11 - Gnomeo & Juliet (United States and United Kingdom)
 February 18 - Eetu ja Konna (Finland)
 February 22 - All-Star Superman (United States)
 February 24 - The Green Wave (Germany)
 March 4 - Rango (United States)
 March 5 - Doraemon: Nobita and the New Steel Troops—Winged Angels (Japan)
 March 8 - VeggieTales: 'Twas the Night Before Easter (United States)
 March 10 - Die Tigerentenbande – Der Film (Germany)
 March 11: 
 George the Hedgehog (Poland)
 Mars Needs Moms (United States)
 March 15 - Barbie: A Fairy Secret (United States)
 March 19 - Pretty Cure All Stars DX3: Deliver the Future! The Rainbow-Colored Flower That Connects the World (Japan)
 March 22 - The Little Engine That Could (United States)
 March 26 - Broken Blade 6: Bastions of Sorrow (Japan)
 April 6:
 Titeuf (France)
 Winnie the Pooh (United States)
 April 11 - Marx Reloaded (Germany)
 April 15 - Rio (United States)
 April 16:
 Crayon Shin-chan: The Storm Called: Operation Golden Spy (Japan)
 Detective Conan: Quarter of Silence (Japan)
 April 29:
 Hoodwinked Too! Hood vs. Evil (United States)
 Legend of the Millennium Dragon (Japan)
 May 1 - Children of the Devil (Germany)
 May 7 - Children Who Chase Lost Voices from Deep Below (Japan)
 May 10:
 Chop Kick Panda (United States)
 Gene-Fusion (United States)
 May 17 - Thor: Tales of Asgard (United States)
 May 26 - Kung Fu Panda 2 (United States)
 May 28 - Buddha: The Great Departure (Japan)
 June 1:
 Orla Frosnapper (Denmark)
 The Rabbi's Cat (France)
 June 3 - The Lion of Judah (United States)
 June 4 - Sengoku Basara: The Last Party (Japan)
 June 7 - Green Lantern: Emerald Knights (United States)
 June 8 - The Prodigies (France, Luxembourg and Belgium)
 June 23 - Werner – Eiskalt! (Germany)
 June 24 - Cars 2 (United States)
 June 25 - Heaven's Lost Property the Movie: The Angeloid of Clockwork (Japan)
 July 2 - Fullmetal Alchemist: The Sacred Star of Milos (Japan)
 July 9 - A Fairly Odd Movie: Grow Up, Timmy Turner! (United States and Canada)
 July 11 - Legend of a Rabbit (China)
 July 15 - The Tibetan Dog (China and Japan)
 July 16:
 From up on Poppy Hill (Japan)
 Pokémon the Movie: Black—Victini and Reshiram (Japan)
 Pokémon the Movie: White—Victini and Zekrom (Japan)
 July 20 - Tales of the Night (France)
 July 27 - Naruto: Blood Prison (Japan)
 July 28:
 Leafie, A Hen into the Wild (South Korea)
 Seer (China)
 July 29 - Jock the Hero Dog (South Africa)
 July 30 - Alice in the Country of Hearts: Wonderful Wonder World (Japan)
 August 5 - Phineas and Ferb: Across the 2nd Dimension (United States)
 August 10 - Jensen & Jensen (Denmark)
 August 11:
 Crulic: The Path to Beyond (Romania and Poland)
 Legend of the Moles: The Frozen Horror (China and Spain)
 August 13 - VeggieTales: Princess and the Popstar (United States)
 August 23 - Tom and Jerry and the Wizard of Oz (United States)
 August 25 - Lotte and the Moonstone Secret (Estonia and Latvia)
 August 27 - Hayate the Combat Butler! Heaven Is a Place on Earth (Japan)
 September 1 - Princess Lillifee and the Little Unicorn (Germany)
 September 3:
 Mardock Scramble: The Second Combustion (Japan)
 Scooby-Doo! Legend of the Phantosaur (United States)
 Tekken: Blood Vengeance (Japan)
 September 5 - Frog Paradise (Russia)
 September 10 - A Letter to Momo (Japan)
 September 13 - Barbie: Princess Charm School (United States)
 September 16 - Top Cat: The Movie (Mexico and Argentina)
 September 17 - The Light of a Firefly Forest (Japan)
 September 19 - Wrinkles (Spain)
 September 29:
 Alois Nebel (Czech Republic)
 Ronal the Barbarian (Denmark)
 October 1:
 Brave Rabbit (China)
 The Princess and the Pilot (Japan)
 October 4 - VeggieTales: The Little Drummer Boy (United States)
 October 7 - SeeFood (Malaysia)
 October 8 - The King of Pigs (South Korea)
 October 11 - Puss in Boots: A Furry Tale (United States)
 October 13 - Laura's Star and the Dream Monster (Germany)
 October 14 - Legends of Valhalla: Thor (Iceland, Germany and Ireland)
 October 18 - Batman: Year One (United States)
 October 19 - Emilie Jolie (Belgium and France)
 October 21:
 La Leyenda de La Llorona (Mexico)
 A Monster in Paris (France)
 October 23 - Magic Tree House (Japan)
 October 28 - Puss in Boots (United States)
 November - Walter & Tandoori's Christmas (Canada)
 November 1 - Tappy Toes (United States)
 November 3 - Tormenti – Film disegnato (Italy)
 November 4 - Johnny Bravo Goes to Bollywood (United States)
 November 8:
 Barbie: A Perfect Christmas (United States)
 Leapfrog: Phonics Farm (United States)
 November 11: 
 Arthur Christmas (United States and United Kingdom)
 Super K – The Movie (India)
 November 15 - The Littlest Angel (United States)
 November 18:
 Happy Feet Two (United States and Australia)
 The Magic Crystal (Finland)
 November 23 - The Painting (Belgium and France)
 November 25 - Daddy, I'm a Zombie (Spain)
 December 2 - The Elf Who Stole Christmas (Spain)
 December 3 - K-On! (Japan)
 December 8 - The Tragedy of Man (Hungary)
 December 17 - Friends: Naki on Monster Island (Japan)
 December 21 - The Adventures of Tintin (United States)
 December 22 - Kikoriki. Team Invincible (Russia)
 December 29 - Ivan Tsarevich and the Grey Wolf (Russia)
 December 31 - The Jungle Bunch: Back to the Ice Floe (France)
 Specific date unknown:
 Jesus: He Lived Among Us (United States)
 Kuiba (China)
 Tatsumi (Singapore)

Television series debuts

Television series endings

Births

May
 May 17: Rylee Alazraqui, American actress and daughter of Carlos Alazraqui (voice of Emma in Stillwater, Rok-Tahk in Star Trek: Prodigy, Julie and Safari Sarah in Doug Unplugs, Grace in Puppy Dog Pals, Milk in the Apple & Onion episode "A New Life", Agnes in the Doc McStuffins episode "The Doc McStuffins Christmas Special", additional voices in Summer Camp Island).

September
 September 15: Lexi Sexton, American child actor (voice of Adelaide Chang in The Loud House and The Casagrandes, Kid At Home #3 in the Teen Titans Go! episode "Toddler Titans... Yay!").

Deaths

January
 January 6: Aron Kincaid, American actor (voice of Killer Croc in Batman: The Animated Series, Fritter O'Way in DuckTales, Sky Lynx in The Transformers, the Nerdator in the Freakazoid! episode "Nerdator"), dies at age 70.
 January 11: Tony Geiss, American author, songwriter (Sesame Street), producer and screenwriter (Sesame Street, An American Tail, The Land Before Time, Between the Lions, Play with Me Sesame), dies from complications after a fall at age 86.
 January 13: Jack LaLanne, American fitness & nutrition guru and motivational speaker (voiced himself in The Simpsons episode "The Old Man and the 'C' Student"), dies from pneumonia at age 96.
 January 26: Clément Sauvé, Canadian comic book artist and character designer (G.I. Joe: Renegades), dies from cancer at age 33.
 January 27:
 Boyd Kirkland, American television director (Batman: The Animated Series, X-Men: Evolution, The Avengers: Earth's Mightiest Heroes), dies at age 60.
 Charlie Callas, American actor and comedian (voice of Elliott in Pete's Dragon), dies at age 86.

February
 February 10: Bill Justice, American animator (Walt Disney Animation Studios), dies at age 97.
 February 12: Kenneth Mars, American actor (voice of King Triton in The Little Mermaid franchise, Tuskernini in Darkwing Duck, Professor Screweyes in We're Back! A Dinosaur's Story, Grandpa Longneck in The Land Before Time franchise, Beethoven in the Animaniacs episode "Roll over Beethoven", Dr. Gunter Hunterhanker in the Freakazoid! episode "Candle Jack"), dies at age 75.
 February 21: Dwayne McDuffie, American comic book writer, television producer and writer (Warner Bros. Animation), dies from complications from emergency heart surgery at age 49.
 February 22: Jean Dinning, American singer (sang "Blame It on the Samba" in Melody Time), dies at age 86.

March
 March 20: Johnny Pearson, English composer (Captain Pugwash), dies at age 85.
 March 23: Elizabeth Taylor, English-American actress (voice of Maggie Simpson in The Simpsons episode "Lisa's First Word", Mrs. Andrews in the Captain Planet and the Planeteers episode "A Formula for Hate", Sarah in the God, the Devil and Bob episode "God's Girlfriend", voiced herself in The Simpsons episode "Krusty Gets Kancelled"), dies from heart failure at age 79.

April
 April 4: Wayne Robson, Canadian actor (voice of Frank in The Rescuers Down Under), dies at age 64.
 April 17: Osamu Dezaki, Japanese film director, producer (co-founder of Madhouse) and screenwriter, dies at age 67.
 April 27: Angayuqaq Oscar Kawagley, Yup'ik anthropologist, teacher and actor (voice of Inuit Narrator in Brother Bear), dies from cancer at age 76.

May
 May 10: Norma Zimmer, American actress (voice of White Rose in Alice in Wonderland), dies at age 87.
 May 16: Bill Skiles, American comedian (voice of Monkeys in The Jungle Book), dies at age 79.
 May 20: Randy Savage, American professional wrestler and actor (voice of Thug in Bolt, Sasquatch in The X's, Rasslor in the Dexter's Laboratory episode of the same name, Leonard Ghostal in the Space Ghost Coast to Coast episode "Piledriver", Master Sergeant Emily Dickinson Jones in the Duck Dodgers episode "Back to the Academy", Biker in the Whatever Happened to Robot Jones? episode "Family Vacation", Gorilla in the King of the Hill episode "Bill, Bulk and the Body Buddies"), dies at age 58.

June
 June 18: Clarence Clemons, American musician and actor (voice of the Narrator in The Simpsons episode "Grift of the Magi"), dies from a stroke at age 69.
 June 23:
 Peter Falk, American actor (voice of Bailey in Hubert's Brain, Don Feinberg in Shark Tale), dies from pneumonia at age 83.
 Fred Steiner, American conductor, orchestrator, film historian, arranger and composer (The Adventures of Rocky and Bullwinkle and Friends, Tiny Toon Adventures), dies from a stroke at age 88.
 June 25: Alice Playten, American actress (voice of Gloria in Heavy Metal, Baby Lickety-Split and Baby Moondancer in Generation 1 of My Little Pony, Poindexter in Felix the Cat: The Movie, Beebe Bluff in Doug), dies at age 63.

July
 July 5: Gordon Tootoosis, Saskatchewan actor (voice of Kekata in Pocahontas, Mushom in Wapos Bay, Gordy in Open Season), dies from pneumonia at age 69.
 July 12: Sherwood Schwartz, American television writer and producer (creator of The Brady Kids, The New Adventures of Gilligan and Gilligan's Planet, co-wrote the song "The Ballad of Gilligan's Isle" which was used on Rugrats Go Wild and the Robot Chicken episode "Suck It", and "The Brady Bunch Theme" which was parodied as the "T.U.F.F. and D.O.O.M. Theme" in the T.U.F.F. Puppy episode "Share-A-Lair"), dies at age 94.
 July 15: Michael Magee, Canadian actor, singer and author (voice of Cyril Sneer in The Racoons), dies at age 81.
 July 23: Toyoo Ashida, Japanese film director and character designer (Fist of the North Star, Vampire Hunter D, The Mysterious Cities of Gold) and producer (Studio Live), dies at age 67.
 July 29: Dominique Benicheti, French film director and producer, dies at age 68.
 July 31: Carl Steven, American former child actor (voice of Pigpen and Franklin in Snoopy's Getting Married, Charlie Brown, Woody in Happily Ever After, Jamie Bingham in Fluppy Dogs, Fred Jones in A Pup Named Scooby-Doo), dies from a drug overdose at age 36.

August
 August 22: Joan Gerber, American actress (voice of Granny in Corn on the Cop, Irma Boyle in Wait Till Your Father Gets Home, The Elephant in The Mouse and His Child, Mrs. Rich and Irona the Maid in Richie Rich, Mrs. Kelp in Snorks, Mrs. Beakley and Glittering Goldie in DuckTales, Gotcha Grabmore in Tiny Toon Adventures, Shreeka in the Teenage Mutant Ninja Turtles episode "Shreeka's Revenge"), dies at age 76.

September
 September 4: Dave Hoover, American comics artist and animator (Wanderers, Starman, Captain America), dies at age 56.
 September 14: Kevyn Wallace, American animator (Rocko's Modern Life), background artist (Freakazoid!, The Proud Family Movie, The Simpsons Movie) and layout artist (Bebe's Kids, Earthworm Jim, Walt Disney Animation Studios), dies in a car accident at age 48.
 September 18: Tom Daly, Canadian film producer (My Financial Career), dies at age 93.
 September 19: Earl Kress, American animation historian, storyboard artist (The Kwicky Koala Show, The Addams Family) and screenwriter (Fat Albert and the Cosby Kids, The Fox and the Hound, Hanna-Barbera, The Transformers, The Berenstain Bears, Ghostbusters, Warner Bros. Animation, Mother Goose and Grimm, Disney Television Animation, The New Woody Woodpecker Show, Winx Club, The X's, Monster Allergy, Geronimo Stilton), dies from liver cancer at age 60.

October
 October 5: 
Steve Jobs, American business magnate (co-founder of Pixar), dies at age 56.
Charles Napier, American actor (voice of Duke Phillips in The Critic, General Hardcastle in Superman: The Animated Series and Justice League Unlimited, Cooley in Buzz Lightyear of Star Command, original voice of the Sheriff in Squidbillies), dies at age 75.

November
 November 4: Sarah Watt, Australian film director and animator (The Way of the Birds), dies from cancer at age 53.
 November 7: Joe Frazier, American professional boxer (voiced himself in The Simpsons episodes "Brother, Can You Spare Two Dimes?" and "Homer's Paternity Coot"), dies from liver cancer at age 67.
 November 18: Mark Hall, English animator and film producer (Cosgrove Hall Films, Danger Mouse), dies from cancer at age 75.
 November 30: Zdeněk Miler, Czech animator, film director, and illustrator (The Little Mole), dies at age 90.

December
 December 1: Shingo Araki, Japanese film and television director (Mushi Production, Toei Animation, Tokyo Movie Shinshia) and producer (co-founder of Toei Animation), dies at age 72.
 December 2: Bruno Bianchi, French animator and comics artist (Inspector Gadget, DIC Entertainment, SIP Animation), dies from cancer at age 56.
 December 5: Dan Mills, American animator (Beany and Cecil, Linus the Lionhearted, Hanna-Barbera, Filmation, Teenage Mutant Ninja Turtles, Freddie as F.R.O.7, Asterix Conquers America, The Pagemaster, Cats Don't Dance, Family Guy) and storyboard artist (101 Dalmatians: The Series, Hercules, The Hunchback of Notre Dame II), dies at age 80.
 December 7:
 Harry Morgan, American actor and director (voice of Carolinus in The Flight of Dragons, Bill Gannon in The Simpsons episode "Mother Simpson"), dies from pneumonia at age 96.
 Ricky Garduno, American animator and storyboard artist (¡Mucha Lucha!, Coconut Fred's Fruit Salad Island, The Buzz on Maggie, El Tigre: The Adventures of Manny Rivera, Making Fiends, Family Guy), commits suicide at age 35.
 December 15: Merlee Shapiro, Canadian actress (voice of the Storyteller in Caillou), dies at an unknown age.
 December 30: Ronald Searle, English illustrator, cartoonist and comics artist (The Happiest Days of Your Life, Energetically Yours, Those Magnificent Men in their Flying Machines, Monte Carlo or Bust! and Dick Deadeye, or Duty Done), dies at age 91.

See also
2011 in anime

References

External links 
Animated works of the year, listed in the IMDb

 
2010s in animation
2011